The Silent Age is a point and click adventure game, developed by Danish indie game studio House on Fire, and released for iOS, Android, Kindle Fire, Windows, Mac. The game's story focuses on a janitor who is plunged into a task of saving humanity from an apocalyptic event by using time travel, discovering the future that will come about if the event is not prevented. The game was originally released as two episodes, before both were packaged together for sale, and received positive reviews from critics upon its release.

Gameplay 
The Silent Age functions on a simple point and click interface, in which players can interact with specific objects when the cursor is over them, and must solve a series of puzzles to advance, mainly by finding items needed to overcome obstacles. The main element of play includes a portable time machine that allows the protagonist to shift between the present and the future, allowing them to find objects in both to solve puzzles in each era. The game is divided into chapters, with each requiring the player to complete puzzles in order to advance to the next one. An example might be trying to find a way to open a door, and locating the means by time-travelling to locate an object that can overcome this.

Plot 
In 1972, a janitor named Joe works for the American company Archon. One day, his superiors assign him to take over the duties of his co-worker Frank, who has left the company. When cleaning the company's basement laboratories, Joe finds an elderly man dying in a chamber housing an odd device. The man identifies himself as Dr. Lambert, and that he is from the future attempting to prevent an extinction event. Before dying, Lambert hands Joe a portable time machine and instructs him to find his younger self and explain to him what happened that day. When Joe attempts to leave the laboratories, the company's security arrest him for industrial espionage and hand him to the police. During his interrogation at the police station, Joe uses the device and finds himself in the ruins of the building in the future, discovering that humanity went extinct after 1972.

Heeding Lambert's instructions, Joe uses time travel to move through the city, eventually locating where the young Lambert resides. Upon reaching him, Joe finds himself confronted as an intruder, until Lambert is shown the time machine and recognises his own handiwork from the future. Lambert reveals to Joe that he developed time travel, and gained the interests of the US government who wanted to use it to extinguish communism before it was founded. Learning that the laws of causality would prohibit this, time travel was used to bring back advanced weapons from the future instead. Archon was tasked with hiring pilots to travel to the future, but returned claiming that humanity was wiped out by an advanced disease. Lambert quickly refused to be involved in the acquisition of the virus, and went into seclusion shortly afterwards, while Archon continued time travel operations.

Determining from Joe's words that Archon will succeed but inadvertently bring about humanity's extinction as a result, Lambert configures the time machine to send Joe back to the previous day and sabotage the company's supercomputer. Joe returns to Archon and succeeds in this while avoiding his past self. Checking on the body of the future Lambert, he quickly discovers he feigned his death long enough to speak to the future Joe, and reveals someone has used the time machine. Modifying the time machine before he eventually will die, Lambert sends Joe to the far future to prevent the virus being brought back. Upon reaching the chronological period the pilot arrived in, Joe finds himself shocked to discover Frank living in a makeshift camp, dying from the virus.

Frank quickly reveals he was a Soviet spy, sent to acquire information that would strengthen Moscow's political power. In discovering Archon, he decided to seize information on time travel, but got caught, and thus used the company's time machine to escape. Frank gives Joe the fuse for the machine, allowing him to leave, but upon returning to 1972, Joe discovers he is the person who will trigger the extinction event. Left with no choice, Joe manages to use one of the company's cryo chambers to avoid infecting everyone. He eventually awakens in 2012, and learns from a doctor that Archon went bankrupt after 1972, that the other time pilots have lost their sanity, and that the disease was a rare  form of avian flu. Learning he was cured, Joe takes up an offer to enjoy the opportunities of the 21st century, and returns to live a new life in the world.

Reception 
The game has received mostly positive reviews. As of December 2014, Metacritic lists a score of 84 (out of 100) for Episode 1, and a score of 81 (out of 100) for Episode 2, both ratings of "Generally Favorable Reviews". Regarding the first episode, the one initially released in 2012, critics are in favor of the game's puzzle and graphics design, but criticized it for its short gameplay. Episode 2, which was released on October 16, 2014, received mostly positive reviews from critics. Gamezebo gives it 4.5 out of 5 stars, stating that while the episode serves as a "satisfying conclusion to Joe’s story and the time-traveling mystery", while pointing out flaws in the episode's puzzle design. Pocketgamer gives the episode a score of 7/10. Ragequit.gr gave the game 84/100 saying that the game is "Very well written and beautifully presented, House on Fire's debut will absolutely thrill fans of darker, more mature science fiction." Multiplayer.it gives the game 8/10 stating that "Rich in style and atmosphere, with a compelling plot and nice minimalist
graphics, The Silent Age is a solid attempt at the point-and-click adventure genre."

See also 

 Time travel
 Puzzle video game

References

External links 
 

2012 video games
IOS games
Android (operating system) games
Adventure games
Puzzle video games
Point-and-click adventure games
Science fiction video games
Single-player video games
Indie video games
Video games developed in Denmark
Video games set in 1972
Video games set in 2012
Alternate history video games
Video games about time travel
Post-apocalyptic video games
Cold War video games
MacOS games
Windows games